Paegam Airport(백암비행장) is an airport in Paegam, Hamgyong-bukto, North Korea.

Facilities 
The airfield has a single grass runway 11/29 measuring 4800 x 400 feet (1463 x 122 m).  It is sited a few miles from the border with China and approximately 37 km east of Samjiyŏn Airport.

References 

Airports in North Korea
North Hamgyong